The 1993 LPGA Championship was the 39th LPGA Championship, played June 10–13 at Bethesda Country Club in Bethesda, Maryland, a suburb northwest of Washington, D.C.

Patty Sheehan won the fourth of her six major titles, one stroke ahead of runner-up Lauri Merten. She trailed by two strokes after entering the final round, and it was her third and final win at the LPGA Championship, with previous victories in 1983 and 1984.

This was the last of four consecutive LPGA Championships at Bethesda Country Club.

Past champions in the field

Made the cut

Source:

Missed the cut

Source:

Final leaderboard
Sunday, June 13, 1993

Source:

References

External links
Bethesda Country Club

Women's PGA Championship
Golf in Maryland
LPGA Championship
LPGA Championship
LPGA Championship
LPGA Championship
Women's sports in Maryland